Grand Hotel Huis ter Duin is a seaside hotel and congress center in Noordwijk aan Zee, South Holland, Netherlands, with views over the North Sea. It is notable for being decorated in a clown theme, with many paintings of clowns, and for housing the Michelin-starred  Latour restaurant.

History

In 1885 the building was completed and in 1887 the hotel was bought by entrepreneur Heinrich Tappenbeck from the Noordwijk municipality,  Tappenbeck immediately began to address business internationally (especially in Germany) and advertised on the good accessibility (by steam tram) and the good connections to major cities such as Amsterdam and Leiden. During the 1970s Huis ter Duin was bought by the Noorlander family.

The hotel has always focused on affluent tourists. Thus, the royal families of Belgium and the Netherlands stayed there regularly. Other guests included Princess Grace of Monaco, writer Thomas Mann and film actors Liz Taylor and Richard Burton. During the Second World War the hotel was requisitioned by the Germans for the post of SS officers. That history was later used in the film Soldaat van Oranje which was partially filmed around the hotel.

A fire destroyed a large historic part of the hotel at January 25, 1990, then Huis ter Duin was rebuilt and expanded in its current style.

Notable residents

Many internationally known guests stayed in this hotel :

 King Willem-Alexander of the Netherlands
 Queen Máxima of the Netherlands
 Princess and former Queen Beatrix of the Netherlands
 Princess and former Queen Juliana of the Netherlands
 Dutch prime Minister Mark Rutte
 King Harald V of Norway
 U.S President Barack Obama
 U.S Minister of Foreign Affairs John Kerry
 Former UN Secretary Kofi Annan
 Frederik Willem de Klerk, Former President of South Africa
 Tony Blair, Former Prime Minister of the United Kingdom
 Mikhail Gorbachev, President of the USSR 1985-1990
 Sophia Loren
 Shirley Bassey
 Grace Kelly
 Liz Taylor
 José Carreras
 André Hazes
 Freddy Heineken
 Dick Advocaat, also a penthouse named after
 Bert van Marwijk also a penthouse named after
 Louis van Gaal also a suite named after
 Dutch football team

External links
 Official site (in English)

Hotels in the Netherlands
Hotel buildings completed in 1885
Noordwijk